Kosmos 138 ( meaning Cosmos 138) or Zenit-2 No.43 was a Soviet, first generation, low resolution, optical film-return reconnaissance satellite launched in 1967.

Kosmos 138 was launched by a Vostok-2 rocket, serial number N15001-05, flying from Site 41/1 at the Plesetsk Cosmodrome. The launch took place at 12:39:59 GMT on 19 January 1967, and following its arrival in orbit the spacecraft received its Kosmos designation; along with the International Designator 1967-004A and the Satellite Catalog Number 02646. The satellite reached a slightly lower orbit than had been planned, but was still able to complete its mission.

After 8 days in orbit, Kosmos 138 was deorbited, with its return capsule descending under parachute, landing at 06:14 GMT on 27 January 1967, and recovered by Soviet force.

References

Kosmos satellites
Spacecraft launched in 1967
Spacecraft which reentered in 1967
Zenit-2 satellites
1967 in the Soviet Union